Otis! The Definitive Otis Redding is a 1993 four compact disc compilation album by American soul singer-songwriter Otis Redding. The first three discs focus on studio material recorded for Stax records.  These recordings are all original mono single or LP mixes.  Three pre-Stax recordings and a demo recorded at Muscle Shoals are also included.  The fourth disc, labeled "The Ultimate Live Otis Redding Show" was compiled from various live sources in an attempt to gather "the best version" of every song Otis ever recorded live and is mixed in stereo.  The 100-page booklet includes testimonials from musicians and individuals from Redding's life, essays, a photo album, track listings, discographies, personnel and recording information.

This compilation received 5 stars on the 2004 "Rolling Stone Album Guide" and is cited as being the most complete collection of Redding's work.

Track listing

tracks 3 & 4 recorded live at the Apollo Theater in New York, November 16, 1963
tracks 8, 9, 11, 12, 14 & 16–21 recorded live at the Whisky A Go Go in Los Angeles, April 8–10, 1966
tracks 1, 2, 5–7, 10, 13 & 15 recorded live in London or Paris, March 1967
tracks 22 & 23 recorded live at the Monterey Pop Festival, June 17, 1967

Personnel

Studio Personnel
Otis Redding – vocals, guitar
Steve Cropper – guitar, occasional piano, bass
Booker T. Jones – organ, piano, occasional guitar
Isaac Hayes – piano, organ
Lewis Steinberg – bass
Donald "Duck" Dunn – bass
Al Jackson Jr. – drums
Wayne Jackson – trumpet
Sammie Coleman – trumpet
Gene "Bowlegs" Miller – trumpet
Charles "Packy" Axton – tenor sax
Andrew Love – tenor sax
Gilbert Caples – tenor sax
Joe Arnold – tenor sax
Floyd Newman – baritone sax
Wayne Cochran – bass
Johnny Jenkins – guitar
The Veltones – backing vocals
The Drapels – backing vocals
William Bell – backing vocal
Gene Parker – tenor sax
David Porter – backing vocal
Carla Thomas – duet vocal
Rick Hall – drumming
Phil Walden – tambourine
Ron Capone – drums
Ben Cauley – trumpet
Tommie Lee Williams – tenor sax

Live Personnel

Apollo Theater
James Albert Bethea, Cornell Dupree & Thomas Palmer – guitar
George Stubbs – piano
Alonzo Collins & Jimmy Lewis – bass
Ray Lucas – drums
Elmon Wright & Lamar Wright – trumpet
George Matthews – trombone
Jimmy Powell – alto sax
King Curtis, Alva "Beau" McCain & Noble Watts – tenor sax
Paul Williams – baritone sax

Whisky A Go Go
James Young – guitar
Ralph Stewart – bass
Elbert Woodson – drums
Sammie Coleman & John Farris – trumpets
Clarence Johnson Jr. – trombone
Donald Henry, Robert Holloway, Robert Pittman & (possibly) Albrisco Clark – saxes

Europe and Monterey
Steve Cropper – guitar
Booker T. Jones – keyboards
Donald "Duck" Dunn – bass
Al Jackson Jr. – drums
Wayne Jackson – trumpet
Andrew Love & Joe Arnold – tenor sax

References

1993 compilation albums
Otis Redding albums
Compilation albums published posthumously
Rhythm and blues compilation albums
Rhino Records compilation albums